The PT Mi-Ba-II is a large Bakelite cased Czechoslovakian anti-tank blast mine. The mine is unusual in that it has two plunger fuses instead of a pressure plate. The plunger fuses give the mine resistance to overpressure, also the plastic body makes it difficult to detect. 

The mine is no longer produced, and it is found in Africa.

Specifications
 Length: 395 mm
 Height: 135 mm
 Width: 230 mm
 Weight: 9.6 kg
 Explosive content: 6 kg of TNT
 Fuze: 2 × RO-7-II 
 Operating pressure: 200 to 450 kg

References
 Jane's Mines and Mine Clearance 2005-2006
 

Anti-tank mines
Land mines of Czechoslovakia